Georgetown or George Town may refer to:

Places

Africa
George, South Africa, formerly known as Georgetown
Janjanbureh, Gambia, formerly known as Georgetown
Georgetown, Ascension Island, main settlement of the British territory of Ascension Island

Asia 
Georgetown, Allahabad, India
George Town, Chennai, India
George Town, Penang, capital city of the Malaysian state of Penang

Europe
Georgetown, Blaenau Gwent, now part of the town of Tredegar in Wales
Georgetown, Dumfries and Galloway, a location in Dumfries and Galloway, Scotland
Es Castell in Minorca, Spain, originally called Georgetown

North and Central America

Canada
Georgetown, Alberta
Georgetown, Newfoundland and Labrador
Georgetown, Ontario
Georgetown, Prince Edward Island

Caribbean
George Town, Bahamas, a village in Exuma District, Bahamas
George Town, Belize, a village in Stann Creek District, Belize
George Town, Cayman Islands, the capital city on Grand Cayman
Georgetown, Saint Vincent and the Grenadines

United States
Georgetown, Alaska
Georgetown, Arkansas
Georgetown, California
Georgetown, Colorado
Georgetown, Connecticut
Georgetown, Delaware
Georgetown Hundred, an unincorporated subdivision of Sussex County, Delaware
Georgetown, Florida
Georgetown, Chatham County, Georgia, an unincorporated suburb of Savannah
Georgetown, Dunwoody, Georgia, a neighborhood
Georgetown, Quitman County, Georgia, an incorporated town and county seat
Georgetown, Idaho
Georgetown, Illinois
Georgetown, Allen County, Indiana
Georgetown, Cass County, Indiana
Georgetown, Floyd County, Indiana
Georgetown, St. Joseph County, Indiana
Georgetown, Washington County, Indiana
Fairview, Kentucky (Christian Co.), formerly known as Georgetown
Georgetown, Kentucky
Georgetown, Louisiana
Georgetown, Maine
Georgetown, Maryland
Georgetown (CDP), Maryland
Georgetown, Massachusetts
Georgetown Township, Michigan
Georgetown, Minnesota
Georgetown Township, Clay County, Minnesota
Georgetown, Mississippi
Georgetown, Montana
Georgetown, New Jersey
Georgetown, New York, a town in Madison County
Georgetown, Brooklyn, New York, a neighborhood in New York City
Georgetown, Ohio (in Brown County)
Georgetown, Fayette County, Ohio
Georgetown, Harrison County, Ohio
Georgetown, Beaver County, Pennsylvania, a borough
Georgetown, Lancaster County, Pennsylvania
Georgetown, Luzerne County, Pennsylvania
Georgetown, South Carolina
Georgetown, Tennessee
Georgetown, Texas
Georgetown, Virginia
Georgetown, Seattle, Washington
Georgetown (Washington, D.C.)
Georgetown, Berkeley County, West Virginia
Georgetown, Lewis County, West Virginia
Georgetown, Marshall County, West Virginia
Georgetown, Monongalia County, West Virginia
Georgetown, Polk County, Wisconsin
Georgetown, Price County, Wisconsin

South America
Georgetown, Guyana, capital city
Georgetown FC, an association football club
Georgetown, Córdoba, Argentina, a suburb of the city of Córdoba

Oceania

Australia
Georgetown, New South Wales
Georgetown, Queensland, a town in the Shire of Etheridge
Georgetown, South Australia
George Town, Tasmania
George Town Council, the local government area that contains the town

New Zealand
Georgetown, Invercargill, a suburb of Invercargill
Georgetown, Otago, a locality in the Waitaki Valley

Transport
 Georgetown Airport (disambiguation)
 Georgetown International Airport (disambiguation)
 Georgetown railway station (Scotland), a disused station in Houston, Renfrewshire, Scotland
 Georgetown station (Ontario), a railway station in Georgetown, Ontario, Canada
 Georgetown station (Metro-North), a former, and currently proposed railway station on the New Haven Line's Danbury Branch

Schools, colleges and universities
Georgetown University, Washington, D.C., United States
 Georgetown Hoyas, the athletic programs of Georgetown University
 Georgetown College (Georgetown University), an undergraduate school at Georgetown University
Georgetown College (Kentucky), United States
Georgetown Day School, a private K-12 school in Washington, D.C.
Georgetown Preparatory School, a Catholic boys' school in Bethesda, Maryland
Georgetown Visitation Preparatory School, a Catholic girls' school in Washington, D.C.
Horry-Georgetown Technical College, Conway, SC, United States

Other
Georgetown (film), a 2019 film directed by Christoph Waltz
 “Georgetown”, a 2022 song by Loyle Carner featuring John Agard

See also 

George Towns (disambiguation)
Georges Township, Fayette County, Pennsylvania
Georgestown, St. John's